The Roman Catholic Diocese of Ouesso is a diocese located in the city of Ouésso  in the ecclesiastical province of Owando in the Republic of the Congo. The current bishop is Gélase Armel Kema

History
The diocese of Ouesso was established from the Diocese of Owando on June 6, 1983. Its first bishop was Hervé Itoua.

Priests and religious
In 2004, the diocese had six secular priests and three religious priests. There were three male religious, and eighteen female religious. The diocese had 28 parishes.

Leadership

Bishops of Ouesso
 Bishop Hervé Itoua (June 6, 1983 – April 22, 2006)
 Bishop Yves Marie Monot, C.S.Sp. (June 14, 2008 – December 8, 2021)
Bishop Gélase Armel Kema (December 8, 2021 – present)

Other priest of this diocese who became bishop
Daniel Nzika, appointed Bishop of Impfondo in 2019

See also
Roman Catholicism in the Republic of the Congo

References

External links
 GCatholic.org
 Catholic Hierarchy 

Roman Catholic dioceses in the Republic of the Congo
Christian organizations established in 1983
Roman Catholic dioceses and prelatures established in the 20th century
Roman Catholic Ecclesiastical Province of Owando